Edward Marmaduke Clarke (fl. 1830-1850) was an Irish maker of scientific instruments.

He worked in Dublin and London, 1830–1850, and was important in the forming and running of the London Electrical Society.  He was buried in All Souls' Cemetery, Kensal Green, London on 31 January 1859.

External links 

Edward Clarke, optician and magnetician

References 

Year of birth missing
Year of death missing
British scientific instrument makers